Jocón is a municipality in the department of Yoro, Honduras.

Demographics
At the time of the 2013 Honduras census, Jocón municipality had a population of 9,591. Of these, 98.78% were Mestizo, 0.76% Black or Afro-Honduran, 0.30% White, 0.15% Indigenous and 0.01% others.

References

Municipalities of the Yoro Department